Nick Harel (born 11 January 1992) is a Mauritian international footballer who plays for Bolton City as a midfielder.

Career
He has played club football for Bolton City.

He made his international debut for Mauritius in 2017.

References

1992 births
Living people
Mauritian footballers
Mauritius international footballers
Roche-Bois Bolton City YC players
Association football midfielders